Eric Nussbaumer  (born 11 September 1960, Mulhouse, France) is a politician of the Social Democratic Party of Switzerland (SP) and member of the National Council, the lower chamber of the Swiss Parliament. He is the current Vice-President of the National Council.

Early life and education 
Eric Nussbaumer was born in Mulhouse in Alsace, France and grew up in Canton Zürich. He studied electrical engineering at the University of Applied Sciences of Zurich (ZHAW) following which he worked for two energy companies for some years. In 1988 Nussbaumer became the director of the energy cooperative ADEV in Liestal, a post he held until 2009.

Professional career 
Since 2010 he assumed as the president of the board of the ADEV. In 2015 he also assumed as the director of communication for the Swisspower AG, a cooperative of Swiss energy works. He is the President of the Board of Convivere, a real estate firm that bases its investments on christian values. He founded Convivere together with a fellow politician of the SP in 2020.

Political career 
He was a member of the municipal council and the Cantonal Council of Basel-Land from 1998 before he was elected into the National Council in 2007. He presided over the Cantonal Council of Basel-Land in the legislative year 2005–2006. He was a candidate to the Executive Council of Canton Baselland in 2007 and also in 2013. He achieved the best electoral result for the National Council in 2011 and 2019. In 2019 he was also a candidate for the Council of States where he came in third in the first round and then did not pursue an election in a second round.

Political positions

Foreign policy 
Eric Nussbaumer supports an improvement of the relations with the European Union. He is the president of the European Movement Switzerland which demands from the Federal Council to begin negotiations over Switzerlands participation in the EU projects Horizon Europe, Erasmus+ and Digital Europe. He also defends the freedom of expression. He was elected the Vice-President of the National Council in 2022, which means he will assume its presidency in 2023.

Energy 
As a member of the energy commission in the National Council, he was involved into the drafting of the energy strategy 2050. He supports renewable and sustainable energy sources and an independence from nuclear energy.

Football 
He was the Captain of the FC Landrat, the football club of the Cantonal Council of Baselland and was also a member of the FC Nationalrat, the football club of the National Council. As a member of the FC Nationalrat, he was delighted when Marcel Dobler of the Liberals was elected into the National Council. On an other side he also sees the FC Nationalrat as supportive in finding alliances in national politics. He opposes the development to higher sums for transfers for football players which remind him of a slave market.

Personal life 
Eric Nussbaumer is married and has three children. He was born in Mulhouse, France, has his place of origin in Lüterkofen, grew up in Zürich, and since 1988 Nussbaumer resides in Liestal, Baselland.

References 

1960 births
21st-century Swiss politicians
21st-century Swiss engineers
Living people